Glenury distillery (also known as Glenury Royal) is a former producer of single malt Scotch whisky that operated under a number of different owners between 1825 and 1985, when it closed for the final time.

History
The distillery was founded by Robert Barclay in 1825, taking its name from the glen that runs through the Ury district. Weeks after opening, a fire destroyed stocks of barley, along with the kiln and parts of the malting floor. Two weeks after the fire, worker James Clark died in an accident with the boiler. Robert Barclay died in 1854, and the distillery was auctioned to William Richie three years later.

The maltings of Glenury Royal were closed in 1968. The distillery then kept producing malt whisky for almost two more decades, but eventually it was mothballed in May 1985.
 
In 1992 the owners decided to cease the malt whisky production at Glenury Royal for good. The buildings of the distillery were sold in 1993 to a property company who turned part of these buildings into apartments.

In 2003 Diageo released a 50yo official bottling; only 498 bottles were produced. A limited release of a 36yo bottling (ABV 51.2%) was released in 2005, and the size of this batch was 2100 bottles.

Present day 
The base of the chimney from the distillery still exists today, though the chimney itself has been demolished.

References

1985 disestablishments in Scotland
Scottish malt whisky
Distilleries in Scotland
Privately held companies of Scotland
British companies established in 1825
1825 establishments in Scotland
Defunct companies of Scotland
Companies based in Aberdeenshire
Stonehaven
Food and drink companies established in 1825
British companies disestablished in 1985